Mara is a 2018 American supernatural horror film directed by Clive Tonge in his feature-length debut and written by Jonathan Frank. The film stars Olga Kurylenko as criminal psychologist Kate Fuller, who investigates the murder of a man and is haunted by the eponymous demon (Javier Botet) who kills people in their sleep. The film also stars Craig Conway. Tonge and Frank based the film's story on conditions and mythology surrounding both sleep paralysis and Brugada syndrome. The film was released by Saban Films on September 7, 2018. It received negative reviews from critics and was a box office bomb.

Plot
The film opens when Sophie Wynsfield is awakened by her mother Helena, screaming, supposedly after murdering her husband. Kate Fuller (Olga Kurylenko), a criminal psychologist, is called by Detective McCarthy to diagnose Helena and deduce whether to commit her to a mental institute. Upon interviewing both Helena and Sophie, both insist that Mr. Wynsfield was killed by the sleep demon, Mara. Kate signs to have Helena committed.

Kate experiences sleep paralysis and sees a figure walking in her apartment. The next day, she goes to speak to a man named Takahashi. However, she instead finds his decayed corpse, killed in the same manner as Mr. Wynsfield. McCarthy disbelieves the Mara legend. Kate visits Helena in the mental institution, who explains how she and her husband knew a man named Dougie from a Sleep Paralysis support group, and begs Kate to let her see her daughter again, insisting she will die at the hands of Mara; as proof, she shows Kate a red mark in her left eye, explaining that Mara marks her victims.

Kate decides to attend the Sleep Paralysis support group run by Dr. Ellis, where she encounters Dougie, who insists that Mara is real and will kill Saul. He removes Saul's sunglasses, revealing his eyes to be completely red. Later that night, Saul commits suicide by immolating himself; around the same time, Kate awakens in sleep paralysis and again sees a figure. McCarthy brings in Dougie, believing he is Saul's killer. With no evidence, they release him.

Kate goes to have Helena released from the institution, only to find her dead, her eyes completely red. Later, she again awakens in sleep paralysis, where she is confronted by Mara. Once she regains mobility, she finds a red mark in her left eye. The next day, she watches the video footage of Helena's death; a dark figure is shown on top of Helena, strangling her. Kate visits Dougie, whose left eye has turned completely red. He explains Mara's history and her recorded deaths, and that her cycle begins following a tragedy. She appears in stages: 1. You're paralyzed, and you see her; 2. She marks you; 3. Physical contact; 4. You see her when you're awake, and if you fall asleep, you'll die. Mara only appears when someone is in a deep sleep; thus, Dougie only sleeps in brief intervals, keeping alarms and blaring music on in his house.

Kate goes to talk with Dr. Ellis, who disbelieves in Mara, explaining that sleep paralysis demons can appear based on a person's culture. Later that night, Dougie's generator dies, stopping his alarm clocks; at the same time, Kate enters the third stage and Mara places her hands around Kate's neck.

The following day, Kate gets a call from Dougie; he is on stage four. Afraid to fall asleep, he attempts to cut off his eyelids before Kate intervenes and takes him to Dr. Ellis. They keep him in a special room to be monitored and give him an anesthetic to make him sleep. He reveals that he accidentally killed innocent people while in the war. That night, Mara kills Dougie. She also turns Kate's left eye completely red before Dr. Ellis pulls her from the paralysis.

After the police arrive, McCarthy and Kate get word that Sophie is also suffering from Mara, already in the fourth stage. Determined to stop Mara, Kate returns to Dougie's shack and makes a graph of all the victims, attempting to put together the link between them. After finding Dougie's war memorabilia, she begins to put the pieces together: Dougie's killing innocents in the war, Saul's causing his mother's death, Mr. Wynsfeld's affair, Helena blaming herself for their divorce, and Kate blaming herself for Helena's death. McCarthy reveals that Takahashi was a chef at a primary school, and caused 38 kids to die by ingesting contaminated fish. Sophie blames herself for Helena's incarceration. Kate realizes the link: Mara targets people overcome with guilt over things they've done.

Kate attempts to reach the hospital to save Sophie. After falling asleep, she enters the fourth stage (both eyes completely red) and begins to see Mara while awake. At the hospital, she finds Sophie in sleep paralysis and attempts to wake her while trying to keep Mara from killing her. Mara suddenly disappears and the redness disappears from Sophie's eyes. Sophie explains she never blamed Kate for her mother. After deeming her safe, Kate falls asleep. When she awakes, she is confronted by Helena blaming Kate for her death; Kate hasn't let go of her guilt. Kate awakens in sleep paralysis, and the movie ends with Mara lunging at her.

Cast
Olga Kurylenko as Kate Fuller, a criminal psychologist
Craig Conway as Dougie
Javier Botet as Mara
Lance E. Nichols as McCarthy
Mackenzie Imsand as Sophie

Jacob Grodnik as Josh
Ted Johnson as Grandpa
Mitch Eakins as Ellis
Melissa Bolona as Carly
Marcus W. Weathersby as Saul
Dandy Barrett as Dr. Botet

Production
The film was announced to be in development in November 2013 at the American Film Market with Olga Kurylenko attached to star, Clive Tonge set to make his directorial debut, and Jonathan Frank hired to write the screenplay, based on an original story created by Tonge and Frank. Producers Myles Nestel and Steven Schneider stated their intention to have the film begin an "Insidious-type film franchise". The film was set to begin principal photography in May 2014. Filming wrapped in May 2016 in Savannah, Georgia, and the filmmakers were searching for a distributor at the 2016 Cannes Film Festival that month.

Release
Mara was released on September 7, 2018, with a limited theatrical run and video on demand release planned.

Reception

Dennis Harvey of Variety called a film "[a] shrill and uninspired horror opus", while Noel Murray called it "a poky thriller that - eventually - delivers some decent scares". Frank Scheck of The Hollywood Reporter said that the film is "sleep-inducing", with Peter Bradshaw of The Guardian giving Mara 2 out of 5, calling it "by-the-numbers stuff" in his closing comments.

References

External links

2018 horror films
2010s ghost films
2018 horror thriller films
2010s supernatural films
2010s monster movies
American ghost films
American supernatural horror films
Demons in film
Films set in the United States
Films shot in Georgia (U.S. state)
Saban Films films
2010s English-language films
2010s American films